The intermediate long-fingered bat (Miniopterus medius) is a species of vesper bat in the family Miniopteridae. It can be found in   Indonesia (Jawa, Kalimantan, Sulawesi), Malaysia, and Thailand and possibly also in Papua New Guinea and the Solomon Islands,

References

Miniopteridae
Bats of Oceania
Bats of Southeast Asia
Bats of Indonesia
Bats of Malaysia
Mammals of Papua New Guinea
Mammals of Western New Guinea
Taxa named by Oldfield Thomas
Taxa named by Robert Charles Wroughton
Mammals described in 1909
Taxonomy articles created by Polbot